Intentionally (April 2, 1956 – January 15, 1970) was an American Champion Thoroughbred racehorse and an important foundation sire for the Florida horse breeding industry.

Background
Foaled at Wolf Run Farm in Lexington, Kentucky, he was bred and raced by Baltimore, Maryland clothing manufacturer Harry Isaacs' Brookfield Farm. His sire, Intent, won back-to-back runnings of the San Juan Capistrano Handicap. Grandsire, War Relic, was a son of the U.S. Racing Hall of Fame inductee, Man o' War. His dam was My Recipe, a daughter of another Hall of Fame inductee, Discovery. Intentionally was conditioned for racing by Brookfield Farm's long-time trainer, Eddie Kelly.

Racing career
At age two in 1958, Intentionally won two of the most important East Coast races for juveniles. First, under jockey Bill Shoemaker, he won the Futurity Stakes at New York's Aqueduct Racetrack in near track-record time, defeating Christopher Chenery's previously undefeated colt First Landing.  Then, in November, he won the Pimlico Futurity at Baltimore's Pimlico Race Course. In the Champagne Stakes, he ran second to First Landing, who at year’s end was voted American Champion Two-Year-Old Colt and given top weight of 128 pounds in Frank E. Kilroe's Experimental Free Handicap weights.

At age three, Intentionally developed into the top Sprint horse in North America. In early April, he won his first start at Jamaica Race Course by 6½ lengths, then ran fourth to longshot winner Manassa Mauler in the Wood Memorial Stakes. . Following this loss, Intentionally's handlers withdrew him from the U.S. Triple Crown series. The colt went on to win important races in 1959 such as the Withers Stakes and the Jerome Handicap. In winning the Warren Wright Memorial Stakes at Chicago's Washington Park Race Track, he set a track record and equaled the world record for 8 furlongs with a time of 1:33.20.  He was voted 1959 American Champion Sprint Horse.

A leg ailment resulted in Intentionally not starting his 1960 four-year-old campaign until June 29. He then won the Toboggan Handicap and Equipoise Mile Handicap.

Owner Harry Isaacs raced Intentionally at age five, but in the fall of 1961 he was sold to William L. McKnight of Tartan Farms near Ocala, Florida. The horse's training was turned over to John Nerud. Intentionally raced at age six, notably beating Carry Back in the 1962 Palm Beach and Seminole Handicaps before being retired to stand at stud at McKnight's Tartan Farms.

Stud career
Intentionally became a stallion of considerable import in the development of the Florida breeding industry. Among his offspring, he sired:
 In Reality (b. 1964) - wins include the Pimlico Futurity, Florida Derby, Carter Handicap, Metropolitan Handicap. Outstanding sire of three champions and a good sire of sires.
 Ta Wee (b. 1966) - Hall of Fame  filly, American Champion Sprint Horse (1969, 1970) 
 Tentam (b. 1969) - wins included the United Nations and Metropolitan Handicaps
 Group Plan (b. 1970) - won Jockey Club Gold Cup, Hawthorne Gold Cup, Stymie Handicap

Intentionally died of a heart attack in 1970 at Tartan Farms and is buried there in the portion that is now Winding Oaks Farm.

Pedigree 

Intentionally is inbred 4x4 to Fair Play, meaning Fair Play appears twice in the fourth generation of his pedigree.

References
 Intentionally's pedigree and partial racing stats
 Information on Intentionally at Thoroughbred Heritage
 Intentionally at Winding Oaks Farm

Specific

1956 racehorse births
1970 racehorse deaths
Racehorses bred in Kentucky
Racehorses trained in the United States
Horse racing track record setters
American Champion racehorses
Godolphin Arabian sire line
Thoroughbred family 5-j
Chefs-de-Race